Events from the year 1774 in Spain

Incumbents
 Monarch – Charles III

Events

Siege of Melilla (1774)

Births

 6 April – José de Córdoba y Rojas, admiral (died 1810)

Deaths

References

 
1770s in Spain
Years of the 18th century in Spain